David Palmer is an American vocalist, songwriter, and photographer, best known as a former member of Steely Dan and as the lyricist of the Carole King number two hit, "Jazzman".

Musical career
Palmer grew up in the New Jersey communities of Warren Township and Watchung and attended Watchung Hills Regional High School. His first band was the Myddle Class, formed in 1964 under the initial name The King Bees while members were still in high school. As the Myddle Class, the band performed at such clubs as the Night Owl in Greenwich Village, and released several 45s on the Tomorrow record label before disbanding in 1969.  Palmer next formed the Quinaimes Band with several Myddle Class members, which recorded an album for Elektra Records before disbanding shortly thereafter.

At the insistence of ABC Records executives, Palmer joined Steely Dan in an early incarnation in 1972.  He sang lead on two tracks on their debut album, Can't Buy A Thrill – "Dirty Work" and "Brooklyn (Owes the Charmer Under Me)" – as well as doubling parts of Donald Fagen's vocals on "Reelin' in the Years", "Only a Fool Would Say That", and "Change of the Guard" to reach the high notes. He also sang lead on most of Steely Dan's songs when performed live in their early concerts as a result of Fagen's early career stage fright in front of audiences. Fagen eventually took over as lead vocalist and Palmer left the band, although he did contribute backing vocals on the band's subsequent release, Countdown to Ecstasy.
In 2014, Palmer sued Steely Dan for unpaid digital royalties, and received a settlement. Palmer has said in interviews he was not being paid his royalties properly for streaming audio online. 

After Steely Dan, Palmer worked with a number of songwriters, including Carole King in the composition of "Jazzman".  He later formed the band Wha-Koo with Danny Douma.  Wha-Koo released three albums, The Big Wha-Koo in 1977, Berkshire in 1978 and Fragile Line in 1979. He also contributed the song "Silhouette" to the 1985 film Teen Wolf.

Digital photography career
Since 2002, Palmer has been a digital photographer specializing in landscapes and fine art images.

He presently lives in Charlotte, NC.

References

External links
 
 
 

Year of birth missing (living people)
Living people
American male singer-songwriters
American singer-songwriters
People from Warren Township, New Jersey
People from Watchung, New Jersey
Watchung Hills Regional High School alumni